Court Street Bridge may refer to:

 Court Street Bridge (Binghamton)
 Court Street Bridge (Genesee River)
 Court Street Bridge (Hackensack River)